Rasim Musabayov, sometimes known as Rasim Musabekov, (b. 1 January 1951, Baku, Azerbaijani SSR, USSR) is a Member of the National Assembly of Azerbaijan, political scientist and specialist in conflict resolution. He worked as Foreign Policy State Advisor for Azerbaijan President between 1991 and 1993.

References

External links
 http://www.meclis.gov.az

1975 births
Azerbaijani political scientists
Politicians from Baku
Members of the National Assembly (Azerbaijan)
Living people

Independent politicians in Azerbaijan